Terance James Bond (born September 1946, in Suffolk) is a British painter, best known for his paintings of birds, catalogued in his publications Birds: The Paintings of Terance James Bond (1989), Birds: An Artist's View (1997), and A Life in Detail: The Art of Terance James Bond (2006).

References 

1946 births
British painters
British artists
Living people